Jeffrey John McMullen AM, is an Australian journalist and author and television presenter. He was a foreign correspondent for the Australian Broadcasting Corporation for almost two decades (1966–1984), international  reporter for the investigative television program Four Corners and later joined the Australian version of 60 Minutes (1984–2000). In 2007 he hosted a 33-part discussion series on ABC1 titled Difference of Opinion. and later chaired many Indigenous forums on NITV. He is the author of a number of books including A Life of Extremes – Journeys and Encounters (HarperCollins Australia 2001); Dispossession : Neo Liberism and The Struggle For Aboriginal Land Ands Rights In The 21ST Century  ( In Black & White, Connor Court Publishing, 2013) and Rolling Thunder:  Voices Against Oppression (The Intervention 2013)

Career
McMullen graduated from Macquarie University with a Bachelor of Arts. Through his work, McMullen has campaigned for improvement in health, education, and access to human rights for indigenous peoples.

He is the Honorary CEO of Ian Thorpe's Fountain for Youth, developing early learning programs and the Literacy Backpack project in 22 remote Australian Aboriginal communities over the past decade.

McMullen was a director of AIME (Australian Indigenous Mentoring Experience) for 15 years, helping to grow Jack Manning Bancroft's highly successful education movement connecting university undergraduates as mentors for Aboriginal high-school students in urban areas. McMullen is also a Director of Engineering Aid Australia, a philanthropic organisation whose primary initiative is the Indigenous Australian Engineering Summer School (IAESS) operating in New South Wales and also in Western Australia at Curtin University, which aims to build opportunities for Aboriginal high school students to pursue tertiary studies and subsequently careers in engineering.

As a founding trustee of the Jimmy Little Foundation, McMullen also worked with the late Jimmy Little and Aboriginal doctors and medical services to improve dialysis, as well as introducing the nutrition program, "Uncle Jimmy’s Thumbs Up", aimed at reducing, and preventing chronic illness in indigenous communities.

He has chaired the council meetings of the National Aboriginal Community Controlled Health Organisation and joined their advocacy in Federal Parliament.

At Prime Minister Kevin Rudd's 2020 Summit Jeff McMullen was among the 100 people focussed on 'Closing the Gaps' in Indigenous life expectancy and improving the well being of Aboriginal communities.

He was founding Patron of the University of Canberra's Healthpact Centre developing health promotion and social equality programs, especially for Aboriginal children.

In 2001, McMullen released his biography, A Life of Extremes – Journeys and Encounters. It examines ideas gleaned from some of the world's bravest individuals contributing to a brighter future for the human family.

He has written extensively in academic journals on Indigenous rights, development and education; contrIbuted regular columns to The Tracker Magazine, feature articles in Arena, Australian Doctor and the Griffith Review.

In North Queensland, McMullen worked with Jirribel Aboriginal elder, Dr Ernie Grant on his holistic education project, set down in My Land My Tracks and also with Dr Grant's daughter, Sonya Jeffrey, in growing the cultural education project at Echo Creek, near Tully.

At Beswick Falls, Northern Territory, McMullen is Patron of the annual Walking with Spirits festival, staged by Tom E. Lewis and Djilpin Arts Aboriginal Corporation, which celebrates the ancient culture of Aboriginal people.

In 2014, McMullen appeared as himself in the second episode of Black Comedy, an Australian sketch show, in a mockumentary about an indigenous boy "tragically born without any sporting ability".

In 2015 Gurindji elders invited McMullen to deliver the annual Vincent Lingiari Oration at Charles Darwin University, honouring those who led the ongoing struggle for Aboriginal Land Rights.

Many of Jeff McMullen's articles and speeches are available on his website, www.jeffmcmullen.com.au

Honours
In 2006 McMullen was appointed a Member of the Order of Australia (AM), for service to journalism and efforts to raise awareness of economic, social and human rights issues in Australia and overseas, as well as service to charity.

Variety, the Children's Charity declared McMullen Humanitarian of the Year for 2006 and he contributed the $10,000 prize money to the Literacy for Life project.

He has been awarded three honorary degrees, a Doctorate of Journalism from Central Queensland University a Doctorate of Letters from Newcastle University and a Doctor of Letters from Macquarie University.

References

Australian television journalists
Year of birth missing (living people)
Living people
60 Minutes (Australian TV program) correspondents